Cnidoscolus aconitifolius, commonly known as chaya, tree spinach, or spinach tree, is a large, fast-growing and leafy perennial shrub that is believed to have originated in the Yucatán Peninsula of Mexico. 
The specific epithet, aconitifolius, means "Aconitum-like leaves". It has succulent stems that exude a milky sap when cut.

It is a popular leaf vegetable in Mexican and Central American cuisines, similar to spinach. White flowers are born on a terminal panicle held high above the foliage.

The leaves should be cooked before being eaten, as the raw leaves contain a high content of toxic hydrocyanic acid. Up to five raw leaves can be eaten a day. To be eaten safely, the required cooking time is 5–15 minutes, with 20 minutes being recommended most often in recipes, and it should not be cooked in aluminium cookware.

Taxonomy
Cnidoscolus aconitifolius subsp. aconitifolius is found from northern Mexico to Guatemala and is cultivated as far south as Peru, while Cnidoscolus aconitifolius subsp. polyanthus (Pax and K.Hoffm.) Breckon is restricted to a small area in western Mexico.

Plants in the Chayamansa group (syn. Cnidoscolus chayamansa) are the most widely cultivated, because they lack stinging hairs on the leaves. It is divided into four cultivars, based on leaf morphology: 'Chayamansa' (most common), 'Estrella', 'Picuda', and 'Redonda'.

Cultivation
Chaya is easy to grow and it suffers little insect damage. It may be a tender perennial in the United States, but persists in climates such as Florida. It is tolerant of heavy rain and has some drought tolerance. Propagation is normally by woody stem cuttings about 6-12 inches long, as seeds are produced only rarely. Early growth is slow as roots are slow to develop on the cuttings, so leaves are not harvested until the second year. Thereafter, Chaya leaves may be harvested continuously so long as no more than 50% of the leaves are removed from the plant, in order to guarantee healthy new plant growth.

A USDA study in Puerto Rico reported that higher yields of greens could be obtained with Chaya than any other vegetable they had studied. In another study Chaya leaves were found to contain substantially greater amounts of nutrients than spinach leaves.

The numerous white flowers of the plants attract butterflies.

Consumption
Some varieties have stinging hairs and require gloves for harvesting. Cooking destroys the stinging hairs as well as toxins found in the raw plant. Chaya is one of the most productive green vegetables.

Chaya is a good source of protein, vitamins, calcium, and iron; and is also a rich source of antioxidants, however, raw Chaya leaves are toxic as they contain a glucoside that can release toxic cyanide. Cooking is essential prior to consumption to inactivate the toxic components. In this, Chaya is similar to cassava, which also contains toxic hydrocyanic glycosides and must be cooked before being eaten. Cooking in aluminum utensils can result in a toxic broth, causing diarrhea, so aluminium cookware should be avoided.

Young Chaya leaves and the thick, tender stem tips are cut and boiled as a spinach. It is a tasty vegetable and is exceptionally high in protein, calcium, iron, and vitamin A. In fact, levels of Chaya leaf nutrients are twofold to threefold greater than any other land-based leafy green vegetable. Chaya leaves have a possible antidiabetic effect.

Traditionally, leaves are immersed and simmered for 20 minutes and then served with oil or butter. Cooking for 20 minutes or more will render the leaves safe to eat. The stock or liquid in which the leaves are cooked may be safe for consumption also, as the cyanide is volatilized as hydrogen cyanide (HCN) during cooking.

Cultivars
There are four well known cultivars, 'Picuda', 'Estrella', 'Chayamansa', and 'Redonda' as stated in Taxonomy. Cultivars 'Estrella', 'Redonda', and 'Chayamansa' cannot produce seeds or fruit due to unviable pollen, while cultivar 'Picuda' and other cultivars can. These cultivars do not have many urticating hairs compared to other cultivars and the wild type of the species, therefore they are more present in culinary use.

References

Other sources

External links
 Chaya - NUS Community, Bioversity International
 Chaya: characteristics, properties, cultivation, care, recipe - Warbleton Council

aconitifolius
Trees of Mexico
Trees of Central America
Plants described in 1923
Tropical agriculture
Leaf vegetables
Mexican cuisine